Bath County High School—the only high school in Bath County, Virginia—is a VHSL Class 1 high school serving students in grades 8-12.

Athletics
BCHS has had athletic success over the years. Most notably, future William & Mary quarterback Jacob Phillips and his younger brother, future Virginia Tight End John Phillips, led the varsity football team to the Class A Division 1 state title in 2003. Pitcher Jailyn Ford led the softball team to a Class A Division 1 state title in 2012.

Notable alumni
 Creigh Deeds (1976), Virginia Senator (25th District)
 Jailyn Ford (2012), NPF Pitcher
 John Phillips (2005), NFL Tight End

References

External links
Bath County High School Website

Buildings and structures in Bath County, Virginia
Educational institutions in the United States with year of establishment missing
Public high schools in Virginia